Velvet: Side A is the fourth extended play by American singer Adam Lambert, released through More Is More and Empire Distribution on September 27, 2019. It features six songs from his fourth studio album Velvet. The lead single, "Superpower", was released on September 4, 2019.

Background
With the record featuring a "70s funk vibe", Lambert stated that he wanted to make an album that was "a slight homage to that period and all the different types of music that I heard growing up" as well as to "hear instruments in my music again, to feel a little more analog. When I get on stage to perform it, I wanted it to be able to be recreated with live players."

Critical reception

Reviewing the EP for the Associated Press, Wayne Parry wrote that it "toggl[es] effortlessly among dance club thump, guitar-driven rock, '70s funk and power-ballad drama", commenting that the EP displays one of the reasons why Lambert was successful on American Idol—his "deep knowledge of and appreciation for vastly different genres of music — and the ability to kill at all of them". Lucy Mapstone of The Irish News rated the EP 8 out of 10 and called it "dripping with glitter and soul and pop and funk and R&B and dance and everything else this former American Idol star could possibly throw at it, but without the tracks becoming too over-worked and clunky".

Track listing

Charts

Velvet: Side A (The Live Sessions)

Velvet: Side A (The Live Sessions) is the sixth extended play (and second Live EP after 2010's Acoustic Live!) by American recording artist Adam Lambert. It serves as a companion to his 2019 extended play Velvet: Side A, the first part of his forthcoming fourth studio album Velvet. It was released on January 12, 2020 through More Is More and Empire Distribution.

Track listing

References

2019 EPs
Adam Lambert albums
Empire Distribution EPs